Štefan Krčméry (pseudonyms Eška, Ján Jesom, Ujo Štefan et al.) (26 December 1892 – 17 February 1955) was a Slovak poet, literary critic, historian, journalist, translator, and administrator of Matica slovenská. He was born in Mosóc (present-day Mošovce) and died in Pezinok.

Life
Krčméry was born to a Lutheran preacher, the son of a member of the Štúr group, August Horislav Krčméry. He went to primary school in Jasenová (then Alsójeszenő), secondary school in Banská Bystrica (then Besztercebánya), and attended a Lutheran lyceum ( from 1907 to 1911) in Bratislava, where he also studied Lutheran theology (1911–1915).

For some time he worked as chaplain in Krajné (then Krajna) and in Bratislava (then Pozsony), but then left preaching and started working as a literary critic, journalist, poet, historian, theoretician, and organizer of Slovak cultural and awareness activities. From 1918 to 1919 Krčméry edited Národné noviny, worked as the editor-in-chief of Slovenské pohľady, and acted as secretary to the reinstated Matica slovenská. From 1920 to 1921 Krčméry undertook a studying trip to Paris together with his wife Hela. Upon his return, he again worked as the secretary of Matica slovenská and was the editor of the renewed Slovenské pohľady (1922–1932), Knižnica Slovenských pohľadov, and temporarily also Slovenský ochotník, Naše divadlo, Včielka and other magazines. In 1930 he left for 3 months to Prague, where he took additional courses at the Charles University, and received a PhD.

In the fall of 1931 he began showing symptoms of mental illness, and the next year fell seriously ill. In late 1932 Krčméry stopped editing Slovenské pohľady and in 1933 resigned from the post of secretary of Matica slovenská. However, he did not stop his literary work. He was also a member of several cultural and societal institutions (Matica hrvatska, Provençal Félibrige, Matica srpska etc.). He moved several times, but was undergoing treatment in Pezinok from 1949 until his death. He was buried in Bratislava, but his remains were later transferred to the National Cemetery in Martin.

Works
Krčméry began publishing in 1913, and contributed to several magazines (Slovenské pohľady, Dennica, Živena, Národné noviny, Mladé Slovensko etc.). In addition to critical realism he also used elements of Symbolism; his inspirations included Pavol Országh Hviezdoslav at the Štúr group, as well as European romantic poets. His most important theoretical work is the two-volume history of Slovak literature: 150 Years of Slovak Literature, where he describes many significant personalities of the 18th and 19th centuries.

List of works

Poetry
1920 – Keď sa sloboda rodila, celebrates the creation of Czechoslovakia
1929 – Herbárium
1930 – Piesne a balady
1932 – Slovo čisté
1944 – Pozdrav odmlčaného básnika

Prose
1932 – Oslobodenie
1957 – Zimná legenda
1972 – Ty a Ja, dedicated to his future wife, Hela Karlovská

Literary science
1920 – Prehľad dejín slovenskej literatúry a vzdelanosti
1927 – Moyses a Kuzmány
1928 – Ľudia a knihy
1936 – Zo slovenskej kymnológie
1943 – Stopäťdesiat rokov slovenskej literatúry
1976 – Dejiny literatúry slovenskej

Other works
1925 – Anthológia szlovák kőltőkből, anthology of Slovak poetry
1925 – Salome, translation of Oscar Wilde's rhymed drama
1944 – Z cudzích sadov, translation of European poetry
1975 – Estetické reflexie

Articles, paragraphs, and reflections
1922 – Slovensko a jeho život literárny
1924 – Literárne snahy slovenské
1926 – O možnostiach rozvoja slovenskej literatúry
1931 – Prozódia štúrovských básnikov
1932 – Melódia vety a prízvuk v slovenčine
1935 – Estetika krás prírodných

Anthologies
1975 – Estetické reflexie
1977 – Román bez konca

References

1892 births
1955 deaths
People from Turčianske Teplice District
Slovak Lutherans
Slovak philologists
Slovak poets
Mošovce
20th-century poets
Burials at National Cemetery in Martin
20th-century Lutherans
20th-century philologists